François Charles Garnier (7 April 1944 – 15 August 2018) was a French Roman Catholic archbishop.

Garnier was born in Beaune, France and was ordained to the priesthood in 1970. He served as coadjutor bishop of the Roman Catholic Diocese of Luçon, France from 1990 to 1991. He then served as the bishop of the diocese   from 1991 to 2000. He then served as archbishop of the Roman Catholic Archdiocese of Cambrai, France, from 2000 until his death.

Notes

1944 births
2018 deaths
Archbishops of Cambrai
Bishops of Luçon
People from Beaune